Olga Sergeyevna Kapranova (born 6 December 1987) is a Russian retired individual rhythmic gymnast. She is the 2005 World All-around champion, the 2007 World All-around bronze medalist, the 2008 European All-around bronze medalist, a two-time (2007, 2008) Grand Prix Final All-around champion, a two-time (2004, 2006) Grand Prix Final All-around silver medalist and the 2005 Grand Prix Final All-around bronze medalist.

Career 
Kapranova first took up the sport of rhythmic gymnastics in 1993 and trained with Elena Nefedova. In 2002, she started to train with Irina Viner, who has coached other stars of the sport, including Yana Batyrshina, Alina Kabaeva.

Kapranova began competing internationally in 2003. She finished fourth in the All-Around at the World Cup in Zaragoza and won a team medal at the World Championships in Budapest.

2004 was a good year for Kapranova but she was unable to make the Olympics, with the two places going to Irina Tchachina and Alina Kabaeva. After their retirements, she became one of Russia's top gymnasts. In 2005, she won the individual all-around title at the World Rhythmic Gymnastics Championships held in Baku, Azerbaijan.

In 2006, Kapranova won silver in all-around at the 2006 Grand Prix Final and another silver medal in clubs at the World Cup Final in Mie. She earned a number of medals in the World Cup series in 2007 and 2008, won the Grand Prix Final in 2007 and 2008, and took the bronze medal in All-around at the 2007 World championships behind teammate Vera Sessina. At the 2007 Summer Universiade she won the silver medal in all-around behind Anna Bessonova.

In the 2008 Olympic season, Kapranova won the bronze medal in all-around at the 2008 European Championships behind silver medalist Anna Bessonova and with rising star teammate Evgenia Kanaeva taking the gold medal. She was selected to compete in the 2008 Summer Olympics after beating Vera Sessina to take the second spot in the Russian team, along with Evgenia Kanaeva. She was ranked second in the qualifications and finished fourth in the Women's Individual event finals.

Kapranova competed at the 2009 World Championships in Mie, Japan and won the team gold medal with Evgenia Kanaeva, Daria Kondakova and Daria Dmitrieva. She retired from competition at the end of the 2009 season.

Personal life
Kapranova has an elder sister, Ekaterina, who is also a former rhythmic gymnast.
She also trained young model Kristina Pimenova, who used to train as  rhythmic gymnast before retiring to pursue a career as a model.

Routine music information

Detailed Olympic results

References

External links
 
 Olga Kapranova Russian Profile
 

1987 births
Living people
Russian rhythmic gymnasts
Gymnasts at the 2008 Summer Olympics
Olympic gymnasts of Russia
Gymnasts from Moscow
Medalists at the Rhythmic Gymnastics World Championships
Medalists at the Rhythmic Gymnastics European Championships
World Games gold medalists
World Games silver medalists
World Games bronze medalists
Competitors at the 2005 World Games
Universiade medalists in gymnastics
Universiade silver medalists for Russia
Competitors at the 2009 World Games